Bailando 2010 was the sixth season of Bailando por un Sueño. It premiered on May 4, 2010. This was the season with the most replacements, due to the withdrawals of two contestants (Luciana Salazar and Evangelina Anderson), and injuries to others. Season 6 was also the first in which the judges did not restore some of the losing couples to competition.

Among the judges, Carmen Barbieri quit the show and was replaced by Moria Casán. Ricardo Fort quit the show twice and was replaced by the journalist Marcelo Polino and Luis Ventura. Fort came back for the season finale, but the production decided to dismiss him from the show.

After two semi-finals, the season finale aired on December 20. Boxer Fabio "Mole" Moli and top model Paula Chaves danced against each other four times that night: Latin pop, Merengue, Reggaeton and Axé music. Fabio won with 50.24% of the public vote.

Couples 

 Luciana Salazar left the competition, and Vanina Escudero entered in her place.
 Evangelina Anderson left the competition, and Belén Francese entered in her place.
 Mariana Conci was the original partner, but she left the competition after Music from movies' round.

Scoring chart

Red numbers indicate the lowest score for each week.
Green numbers indicate the highest score for each week.
 indicates the couple eliminated that week.
 indicates the couple was saved by the public.
 indicates the couple was saved by the jury.
 indicates the couple withdrew.
 indicates the winning couple.
 indicates the runner-up couple.
 indicates the semi-finalists couples.

 In the third duel Lorenzo Lamas was replaced by José María Listorti. 
 In the fourteenth duel Amalia Granata was replaced by Adabel Guerrero and Lola Ponce by Patricia "Coki" Ramirez.
 Fabio "Mole" Moli, Matías Alé and Sofía Pachano were sentenced because they stopped their routines in the middle of the choreography, as they forgot it. Matías in round 7, Sofía in round 8 and Fabio in rounds 8 and 14.
 In round 25, all the teams danced Country as they were in a sentence, so there were no scores. The safe couples, were the semi-finalists.
 replaced by Mónica Farro.
 replaced by Adabel Guerrero.
 replaced by María Fernanda Callejón.
 replaced by Erika Mitdank.
 replaced by Andrea Estévez.
 replaced by Patricia "Coki" Ramirez.
 replaced by Carolina "Pampita" Ardohaín.
 replaced by Vanina Escudero.
 replaced by Rocío Marengo.

Highest and lowest scoring performances 
The best and worst performances in each dance according to the judges' marks are as follows:

Styles, scores and songs
Secret vote is in bold text.

May

June

On June 14, Luis Ventura replaced Ricardo Fort during the sentencing.
On June 17, Moria Casán replaced Carmen Barbieri.

July

August

September

October

November

On November 29, Marcelo Polino replaced Anibal Pachano during the sentencing.
From November 2 to 26 Ricardo Fort was replaced by journalist Marcelo Polino, who scored the remaining couples in the competition.

December

Duel

From November 30 to December 3 Anibal Pachano was replaced by journalist Marcelo Polino, who scored the remaining couples in the competition.

Semi-final and Final

References

External links
  Canal 13's Showmatch website

Argentina
Argentine variety television shows
2010 Argentine television seasons